Peter Lin Jiashan is the Third China-recognized Catholic Archbishop of the Roman Catholic Archdiocese of Fuzhou, China.

Early life 
Lin was born on 2 September 1934.

Priesthood 
Lin was ordained a priest on 11 May 1981.

Episcopate 
Peter was consecrated a bishop on 13 July 1997 by Archbishop John Yang Shudao and was appointed coadjutor bishop of Archdiocese of Fuzhou. On 28 August 2010 he succeeded as Archbishop of  the Roman Catholic Archdiocese of Fuzhou but never appointed or recognized by the government. He was recognized as a bishop since 2016 by the Holy See, but not by the Chinese government. He had been part of the underground Church because of which in the 1980s he had been sentenced to 10 years of forced labor. Finally because of the Sino-Vatican provisional agreement on the appointment of bishops he was approved and appointed as archbishop of the Roman Catholic Archdiocese of Fuzhou in a state-sanctioned ceremony at Holy Rosary Church in Fuzhou on 9 June 2020.

References 

1934 births
Chinese bishops
Living people
Chinese Roman Catholic bishops
Archbishops in Asia